The Ninth Street Seven Arch Stone Bridge was a historical bridge in Lockport, Illinois. The bridge was the region's first over the Des Plaines River, facilitating trade between farmers west of the river and merchants in Lockport. Farmers were previously forced to use a ford, located near 9th Street. It was approved on March 20, 1868, and cost $4,000. The arch bridge was constructed using locally quarried limestone in eight to twelve inch blocks. Each arch of the bridge spanned . The builder is unknown, but may have been Julius Scheibe, a notable local mason who built many of the city's stone structures of the era. Schiebe was also a highway commissioner during the bridge's construction. A concrete slab had to be added to the foundation of the bridge in the early 1900s due to increased water levels caused by the Chicago Sanitary and Ship Canal. The Ninth Street Seven Arch Stone Bridge was closed to traffic in 1971 and was added to the National Register of Historic Places in 2004.

On March 8, 2011, the bridge sustained significant damage following a storm. The City of Lockport decided to demolish the bridge that spring. Pieces of the limestone will be used in historical displays.

See also
List of bridges documented by the Historic American Engineering Record in Illinois
Lockport Historic District

References

External links

National Register of Historic Places Registration Form: Ninth Street Seven Arch Stone Bridge

Lockport, Illinois
Demolished bridges in the United States
Demolished buildings and structures in Illinois
Bridges completed in 1869
Buildings and structures demolished in 2011
National Register of Historic Places in Will County, Illinois
Road bridges on the National Register of Historic Places in Illinois
1869 establishments in Illinois
2011 disestablishments in Illinois
Historic American Engineering Record in Illinois
Stone arch bridges in the United States
Transportation buildings and structures in Will County, Illinois